Moelfre is a hill in Wales on the far western edge of the Snowdonia National Park,  from the village of Dyffryn Ardudwy,  from the village of Llanbedr and about  from the town of Harlech. It forms part of the Rhinogydd range.

Moelfre is a prominent peak that separates Cwm Nantcol from Ysgethin Valley. Moelfre is also known for a legend of three women who worked on the sabbath and were turned into standing stones.

References

Dyffryn Ardudwy
Mountains and hills of Gwynedd
Mountains and hills of Snowdonia
Marilyns of Wales